The Man in the Queue is a 1929 detective novel by the British writer Josephine Tey. It was the first in her series of six novels featuring the Scotland Yard detective Inspector Grant. It was followed by A Shilling for Candles in 1936. It was released during the Golden Age of Detective Fiction. It was initially published under the pseudonym Gordon Daviot, and published by Methuen in London and Dutton in New York.

Synopsis
A young man is stabbed in the back with a stiletto dagger while waiting in the queue for one of the final West End performances of a hit musical comedy. None of those near to him in the queue appear to have any motive for killing him. Inspector Grant is brought onto the case and he follows several painstaking leads, including one that takes him to Nottingham, without any serious evidence. Eventually he traces a potential suspect to the boarding house of the dead man and tracks his landlady to a remote hideaway in the west coast of Scotland.

After some effort tracking and arresting his man, Grant begins to have doubts as he brings him back to London on a murder charge. As the young man is brought before an inquest, Grant expresses his misgivings to his superior but his doubts are brushed aside. Grant's attempts to pursue another possible suspect lead to nothing, and he is almost forced to concede defeat. Just then a most unexpected figure comes forth to reveal the truth of the stabbing in the queue.

References

Bibliography
 Reilly, John M. Twentieth Century Crime & Mystery Writers. Springer, 2015.

1929 British novels
Novels by Josephine Tey
British mystery novels
British crime novels
British detective novels
Methuen Publishing books
Novels set in London
Novels set in Nottinghamshire
Films set in Scotland
E. P. Dutton books